Axel Jungk (born 13 April 1991) Is a German skeleton racer who represents his nation in the Skeleton World Cup.

Jungk finished third in the standings in the 2014-15 Skeleton World Cup season. During the 2015-16 Skeleton World Cup Season, he finished fourth, with a tie with Alexsandr Tretyakov for silver at Winterberg and a bronze at Park City. He once again finished fourth in the 2016–17 World Cup circuit with a bronze at Altenberg.

Jungk finished in second place in the standings in the 2017–18 Skeleton World Cup, racking up a total of 1,507 points from gold at Königssee, a silver at St. Moritz and a bronze at Park City.

Jungk finished fourth in the 2018-19 Skeleton World Cup with a silver at Winterberg and a bronze in Igls.

He began the 2019-20 Skeleton World Cup season with a win at Lake Placid.

Jungk took the silver medal in the Men's Skeleton Singles contest at the 2022 Winter Olympics in Beijing, PRC, finishing behind his countryman Christopher Grotheer who won German's first ever Gold medal in the event .

World Cup results
All results are sourced from the International Bobsleigh and Skeleton Federation (IBSF).

References

External links

1991 births
Living people
German male skeleton racers
People from Zschopau
Sportspeople from Saxony
Olympic skeleton racers of Germany
Skeleton racers at the 2018 Winter Olympics
Skeleton racers at the 2022 Winter Olympics
Medalists at the 2022 Winter Olympics
Olympic medalists in skeleton
Olympic silver medalists for Germany
21st-century German people